In mathematics, a unimodular polynomial matrix is a square polynomial matrix whose inverse exists and is itself a polynomial matrix.  Equivalently, a polynomial matrix A is unimodular if its determinant det(A) is a nonzero constant.

References 
 
 .

External links 
 Polynomial matrix glossary at Polyx (A matlab toolbox)

Matrices
Polynomials